Grazide Lizier née Fauré was a peasant in the Comté de Foix in the late thirteenth and early fourteenth century.  A number of facts about her life are recorded in the Fournier Register, and her life, along with those of her fellow villagers, was analyzed in Emmanuel Le Roy Ladurie's Montaillou.

Grazide was the daughter of Pons and Frabrice Rives, her mother was the town wine seller.  At the age of fifteen or sixteen she became the mistress to her cousin Pierre Clergue, the local priest.  A year later, at Clergue's behest, she married Pierre Lizier.  The affair between her and Clergue continued, however, with the consent of her husband.  The marriage lasted only four years with Pierre Lizier dying when Grazide was twenty.  Soon after Grazide also ended the relationship with Pierre Clergue.

External links
Grazide Lizier's testimony to the inquisition

References
Le Roy Ladurie, Emmanuel. Montaillou: The Promised Land of Error. translated by Barbara Bray. New York: G. Braziller, c1978.

13th-century French people
14th-century French people
People from Montaillou
13th-century French women
14th-century French women